Madinatou Rouamba (born 1 December 2001) is a Burkinabé professional football defender, who plays in the Turkish Women's Super League for Fatih Karagümrük in Istanbul. She is a member of the Burkina Faso women's national team.

Club career 

She played for her hometown club "Etincelles de Ouagadougou".

In August 2022, Rouamba moved to Turkey, and signed a one-year contract n with the Istanbul-based club Fatih Karagümrük to play in the 2022-23 Women's Super League.

International career 
Rouamba took part at the 2022 Women's Africa Cup of Nations qualification held in Morocco. She capped 14 times for the Burkina Faso women's national football team and scored one goal.

References 

2001 births
Living people
People from Ouagadougou
Burkinabé women's footballers
Women's association football defenders
Burkina Faso women's international footballers
Burkinabé expatriate footballers
Burkinabé expatriate sportspeople in Turkey
Expatriate women's footballers in Turkey
Turkish Women's Football Super League players
Fatih Karagümrük S.K. (women's football) players